Locked out from the Inside is the third studio album by Manchester-based alternative rock band Nine Black Alps, released on October 5, 2009. The album was released digitally with the purchase of tour tickets on August 6, 2009. The album was released on the band's own Lost House Records label.

Locked Out from the Inside was preceded by the single "Buy Nothing" (which included the only b-side "Never Wonder Why").

The album was recorded at Bryn Derwen Studios in Bethesda, Gwynedd, North Wales with producer Dave Eringa. Vocalist and guitarist Sam Forrest describes the album as:

Track listing 
 "Vampire In The Sun"
 "Salt Water"
 "Every Photograph Steals Your Soul"
 "Cold Star"
 "Bay of Angels"
 "Porcupine"
 "Full Moon Summer"
 "Silence Kills"
 "Buy Nothing"
 "Along For The Ride"
 "Ghost In The City"

References

2009 albums
Nine Black Alps albums
Albums produced by Dave Eringa